Pyroderces wolschrijni is a moth in the family Cosmopterigidae. It is found in Spain, Morocco and on Malta. It has also been recorded from Crete, Sicily and the United Arab Emirates.

Adults are on wing from mid April to mid May and again from early July to mid October. There are probably two generations per year.

References

Moths described in 2003
wolschrijni